The Ci Banten, or Ci Peteh,  is a river in Banten province on the island of Java, Indonesia.

The rivers in Banten, the westernmost province of Java,  run roughly parallel to each other.
The main ones are the Peteh, called the Banten on the lower reaches near the city of Kota Banten, the Ujung, which enters the sea at Pontang, the Durian, which enters the sea at Tanara, the Manceuri, and the Sadane, which rises in the mountainous region of Priyangan and in 1682 formed the border between the Dutch East India Company (VOC) territory and Batavia (modern Jakarta).

Geography
The river flows in the southwest area of Java with predominantly tropical rainforest climate (designated as Af in the Köppen–Geiger climate classification). The annual average temperature in the area is 25 °C. The warmest month is October, when the average temperature is around 28 °C, and the coldest is January, at 24 °C. The average annual rainfall is 3471 mm. The wettest month is February, with an average of 429 mm rainfall, and the driest is September, with 116 mm rainfall.

See also
List of rivers of Banten
List of rivers of Indonesia
List of rivers of Java

References

Sources

Rivers of Banten
Rivers of Indonesia